Muhammed Bayır (born 5 February 1989) is a Turkish footballer who plays as a left back for Gençlerbirliği. He made his debut in professional football for Bugsaşspor, and was part of their youth academy. Muhammed transferred to Osmanlıspor in 2013.

Personal life
Muhammed became a father in on 24 June 2015, naming his son Adem.

References

External links

1989 births
People from Mamak, Ankara
Footballers from Ankara
Living people
Turkish footballers
Association football defenders
Çorumspor footballers
Bozüyükspor footballers
Ankaraspor footballers
Giresunspor footballers
Boluspor footballers
Gençlerbirliği S.K. footballers
Süper Lig players
TFF First League players
TFF Second League players